Matilde Petra Montoya Lafragua (b. Mexico City, March 14, 1859 – d. Mexico City, January 26, 1939) was the first female physician in Mexico. Initially working as a midwife, she became one of the first women to attend and graduate Medical School, eventually earning her doctorate in 1887. Later she was a surgeon and obstetrician. Montoya played an important role in the social establishment of women's rights and the movements toward unbiased opportunities for education and occupations for women. There is, however, some evidence that a woman named Zenaida Ucounkoff studied medicine in 1877 .

Biography 
Matilde Montoya was the second daughter of Soledad Lafragua and José María Montoya; however, she was educated as though she were an only child, due to the death of her sister. From a very early age, Matilde began to show interest in studying, thanks to the support and the lessons that her mother gave her. She completed her primary education at the age of 12, but was much too young to enter higher education. She was encouraged by her family (though mostly by her mother), to study gynecology and obstetrics. After the death of her father, Matilde enrolled in the School for Obstetrics and Midwifery. The school was affiliated with the National School of Medicine, and she practiced in the hospital in San Andrés. She was later obligated to abandon this career, due to the economic troubles that faced her family. She then opted to join the School of Midwives and Obstetrics in the House of Maternity, located in the streets of Revillagigedo.

Medical education  
At the age of 16, Montoya received the title of midwife, mostly practicing in Puebla, until she was 18 years old. She worked, in her beginnings, as an auxiliary of surgery under the tutelage of doctors Luis Muñoz and Manuel Soriano. Some doctors led a campaign against her, calling her a Freemason and Protestant. In Puebla, she applied to the School of Medicine, presenting her thesis of her professional record. She fulfilled the requisites for chemistry, physics, zoology, and botany, with which she passed the entrance exam. In 1882, she was accepted into the School of Medicine in Mexico City. Matilde Montoya graduated from the obstetrics program at the School of Medicine having passed her examinations in the fields of medicine, surgery and obstetrics.

When she received her M.D. degree from the Escuela de Medicina de México in 1887, today Facultad de Medicina (College of Medicine) of the National Autonomous University of Mexico, President Diaz and his wife appeared in person to congratulate her. The Secretario de Gobernación (Secretary of the Interior) declared her doctor of surgery and obstetrics. Matilde Montoya became Mexico's first certified female doctor. Although, people tried to challenge the accreditation of her studies at the National Faculty of Medicine despite her exceptional grades. As a woman, Montoya faced prejudice upon entering the medical profession that went against social norms. However, Montoya's achievements were an accomplishment for women as an effort to increase their participation in the traditionally male-dominated field of medicine.

Recognition 
Maltide Petra Montoya Lafragua was a distinguished medical professional in the areas of gynecology, obstetrics, and pediatrics. In response to criticism from her detractors, José de la Cruz Porfirio Díaz Mori, the President of Mexico at the time, recognized Montoya's ability and showed his support by granting her a scholarship. Porfirio Diaz was an advocate for allowing middle and upper-class women a fundamental education as an opportunity to advance in medicine.

Legacy 
Montoya was an important leader and member of numerous women’s organizations, along with other female medical pioneers. She belonged to a group of at least 27 female doctors who were a part of 42 different formed feminist associations. These activist organizations emerged within the start of twentieth century, which was a prominent time period for the social movement of feminism in Mexico. The movement would continue to gain momentum after the 1990s which marked a key shift in Mexican politics. The consolidation of these national communities of physicians demonstrated the critical demand of equal rights for women.

On 14 March 2019, search engine Google commemorated Dr. Matilde Montoya with a Doodle on her 160th birth anniversary.

Further reading 
 Laureana Wright de Kleinhans: Mujeres notables mexicanas (Spanish), 1910

References 

Mexican women physicians
National Autonomous University of Mexico alumni
People from Mexico City
Mexican midwives
1859 births
1939 deaths
Mexican obstetricians
20th-century Mexican physicians
19th-century Mexican physicians
Feminism in Mexico
20th-century women physicians
19th-century women physicians